Recollections of the Yellow House is a 1989 Portuguese film directed by João César Monteiro.

Plot
João de Deus, a middle-aged man, lives in a cheap boarding house in an old part of Lisbon. He relies on Franz Schubert's music and films to stave off misery. After harassing his landlord's daughters, he is thrown out of his room. He is sent to a mental hospital, but he eventually manages to escape through the sewers.

Cast
 João César Monteiro as João de Deus  
 Manuela de Freitas as Dona Violeta 
 Ruy Furtado as Senhor Armando 
 Teresa Calado as Menina Julieta 
 Duarte de Almeida as Ferdinando 
 António Terrinha as the Doctor
 Sabina Sacchi as Mimi
 Henrique Viana as the Graduating Policeman
 Luís Miguel Cintra as Lívio
 Maria Ângela Violeta as Madre de Deus 
 Violeta Sarzedas as the Next Door Neighbor
 João Pedro Bénard da Costa as the Dairy Worker
 Manuel Gomes as Laurindo
 Maria da Luz Fernandes as the Neighbor with the Baby
 Vasco Sequeira as the Tavern Owner
 José Nunes as the Kennel Worker
 Ester Caldeira, Ana Banhas, António Terrinha and Dona Gina as Neighbors
 João Santos as the Beggar
 Helena Ribas as the Policewoman
 Adamastor Duarte as the Policeman

Awards
It was awarded the Silver Lion at the 46th Venice International Film Festival.

References

External links
 

1989 films
Portuguese comedy-drama films
Films directed by João César Monteiro
Films shot in Portugal
1980s Portuguese-language films